Eugène Martineau may refer to:

 Eugène Martineau (politician) (1837–1880), Ottawa mayor
 Eugène Martineau (athlete) (born 1980), decathlete from the Netherlands